Tourlaville is a former commune in the Manche department in Normandy in north-western France. On 1 January 2016, it was merged into the new commune of Cherbourg-en-Cotentin.

Heraldry

See also
Communes of the Manche department

References

Former communes of Manche